Puerto Palomas de Villa, also known simply as Palomas, is a small town of 4,688 people in the municipality of Ascensión, in the Mexican state of Chihuahua. It borders the village of Columbus, New Mexico, in the United States.

Geography and climate
Because of this rather high elevation, in addition to its location in far north Mexico, it receives about 5 inches of snow each year.

Tourism
Puerto Palomas is an alternative border crossing for the El Paso area, approximately 90 minutes west of El Paso. Most US tourists come to purchase low-cost prescription drugs, get dental work done, or visit "The Pink Store and Restaurant". The store has arts and crafts from all across Mexico, while the restaurant is known for its dishes made from queso menonita produced in the state of Chihuahua. A hotel is located a few blocks away at the corner of Progreso and 5 de Mayo Avenue.

History
Pancho Villa launched his attack on Columbus, New Mexico, on March 9, 1916, from Palomas. In retaliation, the United States launched the Pancho Villa Expedition, under General John J. Pershing, to capture him.  Notwithstanding more than a year of effort, including one of the first large-scale uses of motorized transport by the U.S. Army, Pancho Villa was not captured.  During this campaign, a young Lt. George S. Patton, later to be known as General Patton, became famous.  During his service and accompanied by ten soldiers of the 6th Infantry Regiment, Patton killed two Mexican leaders, including "General" Julio Cárdenas, commander of Villa's personal bodyguard. For this action, as well as Patton's affinity for the Colt Peacemaker, Pershing titled Patton his "Bandito." Patton's success in this regard gained him a level of fame in the United States, and he was featured in newspapers across the nation.

Education
Several public schools are located in Paloma. These schools require fees to be paid from the households of the students.

As of the 2013–2014 school year, 421 residents of Palomas attend the schools of Deming Public Schools in the United States. Many children living in Palomas are U.S. citizens because the U.S. federal and New Mexico state policies allow women in Palomas to give birth in the nearest hospital, which is in Deming, on the U.S. side of the border. Birth in the United States automatically confers citizenship. Due to the school fees at the public schools in Palomas, the English-language education, and the higher quality facilities in the Deming Public Schools campuses, many parents resident in Palomas prefer to send their children to the schools in the United States. Almost 75% of students at Columbus Elementary School in Columbus, New Mexico, the DPS school closest to the Mexico–United States border, live in Palomas and have parents who are Mexicans.

References

External links
 Official Web Site for Palomas, Mexico (in English)

Populated places in Chihuahua (state)